Szczot is a surname deriving from the Polish word Szczotkować, which literally translates to 'brush'.

List of people 
Notable persons with the surname Szczot include:

 Katarzyna Szczot, better known as Kayah, Polish singer.
 Robert Szczot, Polish football player.

Polish-language surnames